USS Crossbill (MSC(O)-45/AMS-45/YMS-120) was a  built for the United States Navy during World War II. She was the second U.S. Navy ship to be named for the crossbill.

Crossbill was laid down as YMS-120 on 23 August 1941 by Harbor Boat Building Co. of Terminal Island, California; launched 4 April 1942 and completed on 1 August 1942.

YMS-120 was renamed and reclassified Crossbill (AMS-45) on 1 September 1947. Crossbill was reclassified as coastal minesweeper MSC(O)-45 on 7 February 1955, and was struck from the Naval Vessel Register on 1 November 1959. Her fate is unknown.

References

External links
 
 

YMS-1-class minesweepers of the United States Navy
Ships built in Los Angeles
1942 ships
World War II minesweepers of the United States
Cold War minesweepers of the United States